Goodlands is a medium-sized town in northern Mauritius located in Rivière du Rempart District. The village is administered by the Goodlands Village Council under the aegis of the Rivière du Rempart District Council. It is one of the most populated villages in Mauritius, according to the census made by Statistics Mauritius in 2011, the population was at 20,712.

See also 
 Districts of Mauritius
 List of places in Mauritius

References 

Populated places in Mauritius
Rivière du Rempart District